The 2000 United States House of Representatives elections were held on November 7, 2000, to elect U.S. Representatives to serve in the 107th United States Congress. They coincided with the election of George W. Bush as President of the United States. The Republican Party won 221 seats, while the Democratic Party won 212 and independents won two.

This marked the first time since 1992 that the victorious presidential party lost seats in the House, and the first since 1988 that they lost seats in both Houses.

Results

Federal

Maps

Retirements 
In the November general elections, thirty incumbents did not seek re-election, either to retire or to seek other positions.

Democrats 
Seven Democrats did not seek re-election.
 : Debbie Stabenow retired to run for U.S. Senator.
 : Bill Clay retired.
 : Pat Danner retired.
 : Ron Klink retired to run for U.S. Senator.
 : Robert Weygand retired to run for U.S. Senator.
 : Owen B. Pickett retired.
 : Bob Wise retired to run for Governor of West Virginia.

Republicans 
Twenty-three Republicans did not seek re-election.
 : Matt Salmon retired to run for Governor of Arizona.
 : Tom Campbell retired to run for U.S. Senator.
 : Ron Packard retired.
 : Tillie Fowler retired.
 : Bill McCollum retired to run for U.S. Senator.
 : Charles T. Canady retired.
 : Helen Chenoweth retired.
 : John Porter retired.
 : Thomas W. Ewing retired.
 : David M. McIntosh retired to run for Governor of Indiana.
 : Edward A. Pease retired.
 : Jim Talent retired to run for Governor of Missouri.
 : Rick Hill retired.
 : Bill Barrett retired.
 : Bob Franks retired to run for U.S. Senator.
 : Rick Lazio retired to run for U.S. Senator.
 : John Kasich retired to run for U.S. President.
 : Tom Coburn retired.
 : William F. Goodling retired.
 : Mark Sanford retired to run for Governor of South Carolina.
 : Bill Archer retired.
 : Thomas J. Bliley Jr. retired.
 : Jack Metcalf retired.

Deaths 
Two seats opened early due to deaths and were not filled until the November elections.

Democrats 
One Democrat died.
 : Bruce Vento died October 10, 2000.

Republicans 
One Republican died.
 : Herbert H. Bateman died September 11, 2000.

Incumbents defeated

In primary elections

Democrats 
Two Democrats lost renomination.
 : Matthew G. Martínez lost renomination to Hilda Solis, who then won the general election.
 : Carlos Romero Barceló lost renomination to Aníbal Acevedo Vilá, who then won the general election.

Republicans 
One Republican lost renomination.
 : Merrill Cook lost renomination to Derek Smith, who then lost the general election to Jim Matheson.

In the general election

Democrats 
Three Democrats lost re-election to Republicans.
 : Sam Gejdenson lost to Rob Simmons.
 : David Minge lost to Mark Kennedy.
 : Michael Forbes lost to Felix Grucci.

Republicans 
Four Republicans lost re-election to Democrats.
 : Jay Dickey lost to Mike Ross.
 : James E. Rogan lost to Adam Schiff.
 : Steven T. Kuykendall lost to Jane Harman.
 : Brian Bilbray lost to Susan Davis.

Open seats that changed parties

Democratic seats won by Republicans 
Five Democratic seats were won by Republicans.
 : Won by Mike Rogers.
 : Won by Sam Graves.
 : Won by Melissa Hart.
 : Won by Ed Schrock.
 : Won by Shelley Moore Capito.

Republican seats won by Democrats 
Four Republican seats were won by Democrats.
 : Won by Mike Honda.
 : Won by Steve Israel.
 : Won by Brad Carson.
 : Won by Rick Larsen.

Open seats that parties held

Democratic seats held by Democrats 
Three held five of their open seats.
 : Won by Betty McCollum.
 : Won by Lacy Clay.
 : Won by James Langevin.

Republican seats held by Republicans 
Twenty held fourteen of their open seats.
 : Won by Jeff Flake.
 : Won by Darrell Issa.
 : Won by Ander Crenshaw.
 : Won by Ric Keller.
 : Won by Adam Putnam.
 : Won by Butch Otter.
 : Won by Mark Kirk.
 : Won by Tim Johnson.
 : Won by Mike Pence.
 : Won by Brian Kerns.
 : Won by Todd Akin.
 : Won by Denny Rehberg.
 : Won by Tom Osborne.
 : Won by Mike Ferguson.
 : Won by Pat Tiberi.
 : Won by Todd Russell Platts.
 : Won by Henry E. Brown Jr.
 : Won by John Culberson.
 : Won by Jo Ann Davis.
 : Won by Eric Cantor.

Alabama

Alaska

Arizona

Arkansas

California

Colorado

Connecticut

Delaware

Florida

Georgia

Hawaii

Idaho

Illinois

Indiana

Iowa

Kansas

Kentucky

Louisiana

Maine

Maryland

Massachusetts

Michigan

Minnesota

Mississippi

Missouri

Montana

Nebraska

Nevada

New Hampshire

New Jersey

New Mexico

New York

North Carolina

North Dakota

Ohio

Oklahoma

Oregon

Pennsylvania

Rhode Island

South Carolina

South Dakota

Tennessee

Texas

Utah

Vermont

Virginia

Washington

West Virginia

Wisconsin

Wyoming

See also
 2000 United States elections
 2000 United States gubernatorial elections
 2000 United States presidential election
 2000 United States Senate elections
 106th United States Congress
 107th United States Congress

Notes

References

External links
 United States Election 2000 Web Archive from the U.S. Library of Congress